Mount Vernon is a census-designated place (CDP) and unincorporated community in Fairfax County, Virginia, United States. The population was 12,416 at the 2010 census.  Primarily due to its historical significance and natural recreation and beauty, the Mount Vernon area receives over one million tourists each year.

While the name "Mount Vernon"—drawn from the Mount Vernon estate, the home of George Washington located south of Alexandria—is often used locally to refer to the entire unincorporated area between Old Town Alexandria and Fort Belvoir, Mount Vernon as defined by the Census Bureau encompasses only the portion bounded by the Potomac River to the south, Fort Belvoir to the west, U.S. Route 1 to the north, and Little Hunting Creek to the east.

History
The Mount Vernon area is all land which was once a part of the farms of George and Martha Washington's expansive Mount Vernon estate. Much of the land was gradually donated through the dying wishes of George and Martha Washington to the public and others who are affiliated with the Washington family.  The Neighboring/incorporated Woodlawn Plantation and area which was given to Washington's grand-daughter, Eleanor Parke Custis Lewis. The Gum Springs portion was established by slaves and blacks which were generally escaped or freed slaves from the Mount Vernon Estate and area.

Beginning with the 2010 United States Census, the U.S. Census Bureau defined the portion of Mount Vernon north of U.S. Route 1 as a separate CDP, Woodlawn, reducing Mount Vernon's land area by approximately a third and its population by more than half.

Geography

Mount Vernon sits on the Atlantic Coastal Plain on the north side of the Potomac River. Two small tributaries of the river flow south through the CDP: Dogue Creek runs through the western part of the CDP, and Little Hunting Creek forms the CDP's eastern border.

As a suburb of Washington, D.C., Mount Vernon is a part of both the Washington Metropolitan Area and the larger Baltimore-Washington Metropolitan Area. It borders other Washington suburbs on all sides, including: Woodlawn and Hybla Valley to the north, Fort Hunt to the east, Accokeek and Bryans Road, Maryland across the Potomac River to the southeast, and Fort Belvoir to the west.

Demographics

As of the census of 2000, there were 28,582 people, 10,575 households, and 7,487 families residing in the CDP. The population density was 1,450.1/km2 (3,755.8/sq mi). There were 10,926 housing units at an average density of 1,435.7/sq mi (554.3/km2). The racial makeup of the CDP was 54.42% White, 27.65% African American, 0.33% Native American, 6.33% Asian, 0.13% Pacific Islander, 6.87% from other races, and 4.26% from two or more races. Hispanic or Latino of any race were 14.50% of the population.

There were 10,575 households, out of which 34.4% had children under the age of 18 living with them, 51.0% were married couples living together, 15.0% had a female householder with no husband present, and 29.2% were non-families. 22.6% of all households were made up of individuals, and 4.4% had someone living alone who was 65 years of age or older. The average household size was 2.70 and the average family size was 3.16.

In the CDP, the population was spread out, with 26.3% under the age of 18, 7.9% from 18 to 24, 32.4% from 25 to 44, 24.4% from 45 to 64, and 9.0% who were 65 years of age or older. The median age was 36 years. For every 100 females, there were 94.3 males. For every 100 females age 18 and over, there were 90.8 males.

The median income for a household in the CDP was $61,119, and the median income for a family was $67,892. Males had a median income of $42,049 versus $33,543 for females. The per capita income for the CDP was $29,299. About 5.3% of families and 7.0% of the population were below the poverty line, including 9.7% of those under age 18 and 2.4% of those age 65 or over.

Education
Mount Vernon is within Fairfax County Public Schools. Mount Vernon High School serves the community.

Previously The Islamic Saudi Academy of Washington had a campus in Mount Vernon.

Notable locations
The Mount Vernon area is known for its historical and tourist sites and includes several notable locations including:
 George and Martha Washington's Mount Vernon Estate.
 The George Washington Gristmill and Distillery. 
 The National Library for the Study of George Washington
 The Scenic George Washington Memorial Parkway and Trail
 Potomac docks, beaches, trails, and wildlife habitats
 The Gristmill park and Gunston Soccer Club field
 The George Washington Community Recreation Center
 Neighboring Fort Belvoir
 Neighboring Woodlawn Estate
 Neighboring Pope-Leighey House by Frank Lloyd Wright.

Notable people
Mount Vernon is, most famously, the home of the first President of the United States, General of the Armies, and tobacco planter George Washington and his wife Martha Dandridge Custis Washington.

Other notable individuals who were born in and/or have lived in Mount Vernon include:
George Allen, 67th governor of Virginia, U.S. senator from Virginia
Kristen J. Amundson, Virginia state legislator
Charles B. Brownson, U.S. representative from Indiana
Herbert Harris, U.S. representative from Virginia
Oney Judge, escaped slave
Thomas Posey, second governor of Indiana Territory, U.S. senator from Louisiana
Steven Pruitt, Wikipedian
Toddy Puller, Virginia state legislator
Chuck Robb, 64th governor of Virginia, U.S. senator from Virginia

References

External links

Census-designated places in Fairfax County, Virginia
Unincorporated communities in Virginia
Census-designated places in Virginia
Washington metropolitan area
Virginia populated places on the Potomac River